Ivania Martinich Soriano (born 25 July 1995) is a Chilean former tennis player.

Martinich has a career-high singles ranking of 692 by the WTA, achieved on 4 November 2013. She also has a career-high WTA doubles ranking of 824, achieved on 12 September 2022.

Playing for Chile Fed Cup team, Martinich has a win–loss record of 1–1.

ITF finals

Singles (0–1)

Doubles (0–1)

External links
 
 
 

1995 births
Living people
Chilean female tennis players
Sportspeople from Viña del Mar
People from Punta Arenas
21st-century Chilean women